Renzo Accordi (23 August 1930 – 25 January 2005) was an Italian racing cyclist. He rode in the 1961 Tour de France.

References

External links
 

1930 births
2005 deaths
Italian male cyclists
Place of birth missing
Cyclists from the Province of Verona